The 2021 U Sports Men's Volleyball Championship was scheduled to be held March 19–21, 2021, in Brandon, Manitoba, to determine a national champion for the 2020–21 U Sports men's volleyball season. However, the due to the ongoing COVID-19 pandemic in Canada, it was announced on October 15, 2020, that the tournament was cancelled. It was the second consecutive year that the national championship was cancelled due to the pandemic.

The tournament was scheduled to be played at Richardson Gymnasium at Brandon University. It would have been the first time that Brandon University had hosted the men's tournament.

Scheduled teams
Canada West Representative
OUA Representative
RSEQ Representative
Host (Brandon Bobcats)
One assigned berth from Canada West
Two assigned berths from OUA
One assigned berth from RSEQ

References

External links 
 Tournament Web Site

U Sports volleyball
2021 in men's volleyball
Brandon University
Usports Men's Volleyball Championship, 2021